Eva Maria Bucher-Haefner (born 1956–1957) is a Swiss billionaire heiress, the daughter of Walter Haefner.

Early life
She is the daughter of Walter Haefner. When he died in 2012, aged 101, he was the world's oldest billionaire, and had a net worth of US$4.3 billion.

Career
She owns the Moyglare Stud in Ireland.

As of November 2015, Forbes estimated her net worth at US$2.4 billion.

Personal life
She is married with two children and lives in Zurich.

References

1950s births
Living people
Female billionaires
Swiss billionaires